The men's 400 metres hurdles event at the 1970 Summer Universiade was held at the Stadio Comunale in Turin with the final on 6 September 1970.

Medalists

Records

Results

Heats
Qualification: First 2 of each heat (Q) and the next 2 fastest (q) qualified for the final.

Final

References

Athletics at the 1970 Summer Universiade
1970